Colonel Heeza Liar is the star of the second animated series featuring a recurring character and the first featuring a recurring character created specifically for an animated film. Sidney Smith's Old Doc Yak appeared in 3 lost films in 1913 before Colonel Heeza Liar appeared. Smith's series though was based on his Old Doc Yak comic strip. Smith did 13 additional cartoons in 1914 and 2 in 1915.  Colonel Heeza Liar was created by J. R. Bray and is mainly based on Theodore Roosevelt and the general stereotype of the 19th and early 20th century former adventurer and lion hunter. The series ran from 1913 to 1917 and restarted in 1922 until 1924. It was produced by Bray Productions and directed by Vernon Stallings. The series was animated by Walter Lantz from 1922 to 1924 and featured live-action segments interacting with the animation, much like the popular contemporary series Out of the Inkwell.

Filmography

References

External links
 Colonel Heeza Liar at Don Markstein's Toonopedia.
 Colonel Heeza Liar at Big Cartoon DataBase
 Bray Animation Project

Liar, Heeza
Film series introduced in 1913
Colonel Heeza Liar
Liar, Heeza
Articles containing video clips
Bray Productions film series
Liar, Heeza